is an Echizen Railway Mikuni Awara Line railway station located in the city of Awara, Fukui Prefecture, Japan.

Lines

Station layout
The station consists of two side platforms connected by a footbridge. The station is staffed.

Adjacent stations

History
On September 1, 1942 the Keifuku Electric Railway merged with Mikuni Awara Electric Railway. Operations were halted from October 11, 1942 to August 15, 1946. Operations ceased again on June 25, 2001. The station reopened on August 10, 2003 under its present name as an Echizen Railway station.

Passenger statistics
In fiscal 2016, the station was used by an average of 491 passengers daily (boarding passengers only).

Surrounding area
This station serves the center of Awara City and its numerous hot spring hotels and resorts. However, most visitors to the area use JR Awaraonsen Station several kilometers away. There is also a large Keifuku and Awara community bus transfer point located in front of the station, making this station the busiest on the Awara Mikuni Line outside of Fukui City.

Other points of interest include:
Awara City Awara Elementary School
Awara City Library
Awara City Health Center
Awara City Awara Junior High School
Mikuni Kyōteijō

See also
 List of railway stations in Japan

References

External links

  

Railway stations in Fukui Prefecture
Railway stations in Japan opened in 1911
Mikuni Awara Line
Awara, Fukui